LHL may refer to:

 Haldensleben station's DS100 code
 Lahul Lohar language's ISO 639-3 code
 London Hockey League, a men's field hockey league based in London and the South of England
 Abbreviation for Lee Hsien Loong